Joseph Gerald Adolphus Cole (born in 1978 in Freetown, Sierra Leone) better known by his stage name Daddy Saj is a Sierra Leonean rapper and arguably the biggest and most famous musician from Sierra Leone. He uses his music to address political corruption and general corruption in Sierra Leone. His rap is a blend of hip hop and traditional goombay music. While his music is mostly in Krio, Sierra Leone's national language, he does also performs in English. His first album 'Corruption e do so' (meaning in Krio, corruption is enough) struck a chord not only in Sierra Leone, but across Africa.

Early life and music career
Joseph Gerald Adolphus Cole, better known as Daddy Saj was born in 1978 in Freetown, the capital city of Sierra Leone to Creole parents. At the age of eight, the young Daddy Saj joined his church choir, where he was one of the most talented singers. In his teens he found inspiration from some American based Hip hop artists. Daddy Saj fled Sierra Leone as a refugee and moved to Conakry, Guinea in 1997 when the government of the then-president Ahmad Tejan Kabbah was ousted by a group of soldiers in the Sierra Leonean army. He did this in order to save himself from being kidnapped as a child soldier. While in Guinea, he became more ingrained in music, and became friends with many other musicians from West Africa. When he return to Freetown, he linked up with one of Sierra Leone's most famous musicians and producers Jimmy B (born Jimmy Bangura). Jimmy B signed him to his Paradise Family label. Jimmy B had already had good exposure in music internationally. Jimmy was a pioneer in promoting Sierra Leone music to the outside world. As Daddy Saj put it "...so for me it was a great privilege to work with him, it was like being in a furnace; purifying myself for the tasks ahead [laughter]." Daddy Saj recorded several hit songs with the Paradise Family. He then left Paradise Family in 2003 to start his own label, Daddy Saj Entertainment.

His debut album ‘Corruption’ was released in 2003, and quickly became a bestseller not only in Sierra Leone, but throughout many countries in Africa. Many Sierra Leoneans welcomed the song ‘Corruption E Do So’ (meaning in Krio “Corruption is Enough is Enough”) at a time when corrupt practices by authorities and had become rampant in the country. The song spread like wild fire in terms of the rate of airplay on radio stations, as well as its rotation in street bars, pubs and restaurants.

However the airplay of the song did not last long. Some top government officials, including some members of parliament and ministers publicly announced their opinion that the song contained words which did not reflect the reality of the government of Sierra Leone. They warned that the song could become a catalyst for public unrest.

Even though the Sierra Leone Anti-corruption Commission started to use the song as their theme in the fight against corruption – and even sponsored the distribution of it, politicians  called for a ban of the song. Also, rumours started going around that there was a five million Leones price tag on for his arrest.

His second album Densay Densay (meaning 'Rumours, Rumours' in Krio), also aimed to change some social attitudes, those towards sexual harassment. The album talks about women in Sierra Leone who often have no choice but to sleep with their employers to keep their jobs and support their family. His third album named 'Faya 4 Faya' was also an instant hit throughout West Africa.

References

Sierra Leonean male singers
Sierra Leone Creole people
Sierra Leoneans of Jamaican Maroon descent
People from Freetown
1978 births
Living people